Macroglossum leytensis is a moth of the family Sphingidae which is known from the Philippines (Leyte).

References

leytensis
Moths described in 2006
Endemic fauna of the Philippines
Moths of Asia